The Women's individual normal hill event of the FIS Nordic World Ski Championships 2015 was held on 20 February 2015. A qualification was held on 19 February.

Results

Qualifying
The Qualifying was held at 17:00.

Final
Round 1 was started at 17:00 and the final round at 17:58.

References

Women's individual normal hill
2015 in Swedish women's sport